Olamon is an unincorporated village in the town of Greenbush, Penobscot County, Maine, United States. Olamon had a post office until March 15, 2008.

References

Villages in Penobscot County, Maine
Villages in Maine